Fudbalski klub Sarajevo (English: Sarajevo Football Club) is a professional football club based in Sarajevo, the capital city of Bosnia and Herzegovina and is one of the most successful clubs in the country.

Founded on 24 October 1946, FK Sarajevo was the most successful club from SR Bosnia and Herzegovina in the former SFR Yugoslavia, winning two Yugoslav First League titles, finishing runners-up on two other occasions and placing 6th in that competition's all-time table.

Today, FK Sarajevo is one of the most prominent members of the Premier League of Bosnia and Herzegovina, where it has won five Bosnian championships, seven Bosnian Cups and one Bosnian Supercup. Furthermore, the club finished runners-up in the national championship another seven times. It is ranked first in the Premier League of Bosnia and Herzegovina all-time table and is the country's most prominent representative in European competitions. FK Sarajevo is the most popular football club in the country, along with FK Željezničar, with whom it shares a strong rivalry that manifests itself in the Sarajevo derby, also known as the Eternal derby (Vječiti derbi).

The club plays its home matches at the Asim Ferhatović Hase Stadium, named after legendary club striker Asim Ferhatović. The stadium has a capacity of 34,500, and is the largest in the country.

History

FK Sarajevo was the only major football club founded by the post-war Yugoslav authorities in the city of Sarajevo. The club entered the Yugoslav First League in the 1948–49 season, and eventually competed in all but two seasons in the top tier. After Bosnia and Herzegovina gained independence from Yugoslavia, FK Sarajevo became one of the country's biggest ambassadors, departing on a large world tour during the Bosnian War with the goal of gaining international support for the country's cause.

Origins
FK Sarajevo was established on 24 October 1946 as the result of a merger between local Sarajevo football clubs Udarnik (Vanguard) and Sloboda (Liberty). The club first appeared on the Yugoslav sports scene in 1946 under the name FD Torpedo that represented an homage to Torpedo Moscow. The first chairman of the newly founded club was Safet Džinović, while the positions of vice-chairmen were granted to Vojo Marković and Alojz Stanarević respectively. Furthermore, Josip Bulat was named manager. The newly formed team, which inherited the results and league standings of Udarnik, was joined by selected players from both Udarnik and Sloboda. Namely, Hodžić, Vlajičić, Šarenkapa, Pauković, Fizović, Konjević, Radović, Viđen and Mustagrudić from the former, and Mantula, Glavočević, Tošić, Pecelj, Novo, Strinić, Đ. Lovrić and Alajbegović from the latter. The team played its first match on 3 November 1946. Another historical assembly was held on 5 October 1947 when it was decided, on the proposal of then editor of the popular daily newspaper Oslobođenje, Mirko Ostojić, that the club name would be changed to FD Sarajevo later SDM Sarajevo, before it was finally changed to the current name in 1949. In September 1948 FD Sarajevo was joined by Yugoslav footballing legend Miroslav Brozović, who brought in a largely needed level of experience to the new team. The Mostar native previously wore the black and white jersey of FK Partizan, as well as captaining the Yugoslav national team. Brozović was offered the position of player-manager which he accepted, turning his attentions to promoting the team to the Yugoslav First League. FK Sarajevo first entered the top-flight Yugoslav First League after eliminating Belgrade club Sloga. They drew the first match 3:3 in Novi Sad, but then won the second match 5:1 in Sarajevo. The team were relegated after their first season in the First League, but were promoted back to the top-tier in 1950. From then on FK Sarajevo played in every season of the First League apart from 1957 to 1958. The club's first taste of European competitions began during the 1960s when it took part in the 1960 Mitropa Cup and the 1961–63 Balkans Cup, while the first serious European competition the club took part in was the 1962–63 Intertoto Cup.

Champions of Yugoslavia - Bosnian breakthrough
Up until Sarajevo's Yugoslav First League title, no club from other republics within the Socialist Federal Republic of Yugoslavia (other than SR Serbia and SR Croatia) has ever won this competition. The big four of SFRJ football dominated the league and Bosnian breakthrough finally came thanks to FK Sarajevo during the 1966–67 season. With Sarajevo winning the title they ended a run of eight consecutive seasons of winners from SR Serbia (record).

The 1960s: First championship

A key player for Sarajevo in their early years was legendary striker Asim Ferhatović, nicknamed Hase, who played for the club from 1952 to 1967. In 1963–64, he was top scorer in the First League with nineteen goals, while the club finished fourth. The following year the club finished second (to Partizan Belgrade). Sarajevo won their first Yugoslav First League title in 1966–67, becoming the first national champions from Bosnia and Herzegovina. Sarajevo started the historic season with Brozović at the helm of the coaching staff. The team had a dream start with back to back wins against FK Sutjeska Nikšić and their city rivals FK Željezničar. This was followed by a draw against the European Cup runners-up, FK Partizan, in which Sarajevo squandered an early lead. With seven points from their first three fixtures, Sarajevo was still not considered a title favorite, but that was to change after Brozović's boys returned from the Dalmatian coast with a win against Hajduk Split. Four days later Sarajevo beat NK Olimpija 2:1 at a sold out Koševo stadium. Hard earned wins against HNK Rijeka and Crvena Zvezda followed, and by the winter break Sarajevo had won 14 out of their first 20 league fixtures, finishing the year at pole position. The team opened the second part of the season away to Dinamo Zagreb in the last sixteen of the Yugoslav Cup winning 1:0 courtesy of a Boško Antić stunner. In the quarterfinals Sarajevo got the better of FK Napredak, but eventually lost in the Cup final to Hajduk Split, played at the Stari plac stadium on 24 May. The team was quickly back to winning ways, defeating Crvena Zvezda at the Rajko Mitić Stadium 3:1 with two goals by Antić and one by Prodanović. A week later OFK Beograd was defeated with the same margin, but a shock defeat to FK Vojvodina in Novi Sad brought Dinamo Zagreb on level points with three games to go. FK Vardar was defeated next thanks to a Musemić brace, while Dinamo dropped points in Rijeka. In the last league fixture of the season Sarajevo hosted NK Čelik in front of 30,000 spectators and went on to win 5:2, bringing home the club's first league title.

The Last 16 of the European Cup
The league triumph qualified Sarajevo to the 1967–68 European Cup (today's UEFA Champions League), where they played their first tie against Cypriots Olympiakos Nicosia, winning 5:3 on aggregate. In the second round (one round short of the quarter-finals), Sarajevo was knocked out 2:1 on aggregate by eventual champions Manchester United of England, despite hosting a goalless draw in the first leg. The first leg was played before an audience of 40,000 spectators and refereed by the Italian Francesco Francescon. The second leg played at Old Trafford ended in controversy after the ball went out of bounds prior to the hosts scoring their second goal. Notable Sarajevo players during this era included Boško Antić, Mirsad Fazlagić, Vahidin Musemić, Fahrudin Prljača and Boško Prodanović.

Shortly after winning its first Yugoslav league title FK Sarajevo endured a period of general stagnation. The team entered the 1967/68 season as strong title favorites, but the campaign turned out to be a complete disaster. The maroon-whites, managed by former player Franjo Lovrić, did not manage to enter the championship race in hopes of defending the title, finishing mere 7th. The club management quickly named Munib Saračević manager for the 1968/69 season, but this move also turned out to be fruitless. The team concluded the disappointing campaign 11th in the league standings. In the 1971 January transfer window six members of the championship winning generation, including Boško Prodanović, Anđelko Tešan and Fahrudin Prljača, left the club while three more followed in July of the same year, including star player Boško Antić. The next season brought hope with the team going into the winter break clinching first spot, but only managing to finish 7th at the end of season. The 1973/74 season brought in a handful of new players, including the likes of future club legend Želimir Vidović and former Red Star Belgrade and Bayern Munich striker Dušan Jovanović. Furthermore, that same year 18-year-old Safet Sušić joined the club from Krivaja Zavidovići, and would go on to be one of the main catalysts for the club's second major spell at the top of Yugoslav football in the coming years. It is important to note that all FK Sarajevo was able to muster in the first eleven seasons after taking home the title in 1967 was one 6th place league finish, two 7th place league finishes and a 1/4 final finish in the Yugoslav Cup in 1976/77. In that same year the club barely retained its place in the top-tier with a two-point advantage over relegated Napredak Kruševac. The 1978/79 season though, brought a breath of fresh air for Sarajevo fans, with the team finishing 4th behind Hajduk Split, Dinamo Zagreb and Red Star Belgrade, and in doing so signalled things to come.

The 1980s: Second championship

Sarajevo had a second successful spell between 1978 and 1985, led by the attacking duo Predrag Pašić – Safet Sušić, which established itself among the most prolific tandems in Yugoslav and Bosnian football history. Predrag Pašić nicknamed "Paja" was a winger or striker and had emerged through the club's youth ranks, eventually going on to play for Sarajevo up until his move to VfB Stuttgart after the title winning season in 1985. On the other hand, Sušić nicknamed "Pape" played the positions of playmaker and attacking midfielder, and wore the maroon-white jersey from 1973 to 1982, when he moved to Paris Saint-Germain F.C. In 1978–79, Sušić scored 15 goals and was named Player of the Season as Sarajevo finished fourth. The following year, Sušić's 17 goals helped retain his Player of the Year title, but he was also joint top scorer in the league.

On 4 May 1980, during the 23rd round of 1979–80 Yugoslav First League at Koševo Stadium during the game between Sarajevo and Osijek the news broke out of death of the Yugoslav president Josip Broz Tito. The game was locked at 1–1. Later a song by local band Zabranjeno Pušenje dedicated a part of the song "Nedelja kad je otisao hase" to that sad event. The club came runner-up that season, seven points behind Red Star Belgrade, therefore qualifying for the 1980–81 UEFA Cup. Sarajevo was knocked out in the first round by German powerhouse Hamburger SV, that won 7:5 on aggregate. Sarajevo returned to the UEFA Cup in 1982–83 (having finished fourth during the 1981–82 Yugoslav First League), beating Bulgaria's Slavia Sofia 6:4 in the first round and Romanian club FC Corvinul Hunedoara 8:4 in the second, thanks to a 4:0 home win in the second leg. In the third round (last 16), Sarajevo lost their first leg 6:1 to Belgian club RSC Anderlecht, and despite winning the second leg 1:0, were eliminated by the eventual champions. Sarajevo also reached the Yugoslav Cup final that season, losing 3:2 to Dinamo Zagreb in Belgrade. Sarajevo won their second championship title in 1984–85, finishing four points ahead of runners-up Hajduk Split. The new championship season didn't start in spectacular fashion for Sarajevo, but as the season continued the team kept gaining momentum and grasped first spot on way to the winter break.
Boško Antić's boys didn't start the second part of the season on a positive note, winning only two points out of their first three fixtures. Their main rival Hajduk Split also started the second part of the season on the wrong foot, winning just one out of their first three matches, which kept Sarajevo above by one point. Antić's team went on to beat Sloboda and draw Dinamo Zagreb and Željezničar, before travelling to Split for the crucial game against Hajduk. A packed Poljud stadium witnessed a 0:0 draw that ensured Sarajevo's one point advantage over the Croatian side. The title race eventually came down to just the maroon-whites and the Dalmatian side, with hard won victories on both sides. Three games until the finish Hajduk secured a comfortable route over Rijeka, while Sarajevo had a much more difficult time in Novi Sad against Vojvodina; the hosts broke the deadlock after just two minutes of play. Luckily for the huge number of travelling fans, Boško Antić's men were able to equalize ten minutes from the break through a Jakovljević effort, and to eventually snatch the win seven minutes from time courtesy of a phenomenal volley from the edge of the box by Slaviša Vukićević. The maroon-whites now needed five points from their three last fixtures to clinch the title. A routine 3:0 victory over Iskra was followed by a tough match against Vardar in Skopje that ended in a 2:2 draw, after the hosts went up 2:0 just before half time. It all came down to the final league game against Red Star Belgrade, played at a sold out Koševo stadium, where the maroon-whites needed just a point to mathematically clinch the title. Musemić broke the deadlock in the 23. minute and Jakovljević doubled Sarajevo's lead with fifteen minutes to go. The visitors were able to pull one back through Boško Gjurovski in the 85th minute, but it was too little too late. The celebrations began, Sarajevo had won its second Yugoslav league title. The triumph qualified the club for the first round of the 1985–86 European Cup, where they shockingly lost both legs to Finnish side Kuusysi Lahti. This result is still considered Sarajevo's worst in major European competitions. The championship winning generation included the likes of Husref Musemić, Faruk Hadžibegić, Davor Jozić, Dragan Jakovljević, Miloš Đurković, Predrag Pašić, Mirza Kapetanović, Slaviša Vukićević, Zijad Švrakić, Senad Merdanović and Mehmed Janjoš.

Final years in Yugoslavia

FK Sarajevo entered a turbulent period after clinching its second Yugoslav league title. Three major members of the championship winning squad left the team in the summer of 1985. Star striker Husref Musemić joined Red Star Belgrade. Faruk Hadžibegić moved to Spanish side Real Betis. Team captain Predrag Pašić moved to VfB Stuttgart in the Bundesliga. The club management, in search of replacements, turned its sights to young players from lower-tier sides, bringing in Bernard Barnjak, Vladimir Petković and Zoran Ljubičić. Even though the team started the season on a high note, it finished a disappointing 15th at the end of the 1985/86 season, avoiding relegation by virtue of a superior goal-difference compared to relegated OFK Beograd. The following season again culminated in a lowly finish, as new manager Denijel Pirić led the team to a disappointing 13th place in the league standings. Further departures followed at the end of the season as Miloš Đurković joined Beşiktaş, Muhidin Teskeredžić made the move to Sturm Graz, Davor Jozić joined Serie A side A.C. Cesena, Zijad Švrakić transferred to Adana Demirspor and Branko Bošnjak joined NK Olimpija. The following two seasons again brought mediocre league finishes as the maroon-whites concluded the respective campaigns on 13th and 14th spots, barely avoiding relegation on both occasions. As with previous seasons, a handful of players left the club during the summer transfer window, with Slaviša Vukićević moving to Créteil, goalkeeper Enver Lugušić joining Konyaspor and Dragan Jakovljević moving to FC Nantes. On a positive note, the 1989/90 season brought the return of fan favorite Husref Musemić, who had spent the previous season playing for Scottish side Hearts. His nine goals in 26 appearances did little to improve league results, as the team again concluded the campaign on 13th spot, along with an early exit in the Yugoslav Cup after a defeat to Macedonian third division minnows, FK Sileks. The 1990/91 season saw Fuad Muzurović again being named manager after a ten-year absence. Furthermore, Soviet goalkeeper Aleksei Prudnikov was brought in from Velež Mostar, thus becoming the first foreign player in the history of the club. The team was able to conclude the season on 11th spot, defeating Red Star Belgrade in a crucial, hallmark game, only days after the Belgrade outfit won the European Cup. The 1991/92 season was marked by the disintegration of Yugoslavia, and was subsequently abandoned by Slovenian, Croatian and Bosnian sides. Football was abruptly halted in Bosnia and Herzegovina for the duration of the war that would last for four years. Notable FK Sarajevo players in the pre-war period were Miloš Nedić, Dragan Jakovljević, Boban Božović, Dane Kuprešanin and Dejan Raičković.

Recent years
Since the Bosnian independence, the club has won 11 domestic titles, 5 of which were Premier League of Bosnia and Herzegovina honors. In addition the club reached play-off stage/final qualifying round for European competitions on 4 occasions, once for UCL (vs Dynamo Kyiv) and three for UEL (vs CFR Cluj, Borussia Mönchengladbach and Celtic).

War and independence
The Bosnian War in the early 1990s shut down competitive football in the territory, and as a result FK Sarajevo became a touring club in 1993, under manager Fuad Muzurović, featuring players such as Elvir Baljić, Almir Turković, Senad Repuh and Mirza Varešanović, all future national team players for Bosnia and Herzegovina. Many of the club's supporters, including the infamous Horde Zla joined the Army of the Republic of Bosnia and Herzegovina and fought in the war. FK Sarajevo played a number of friendly games during this time, such as the now-famous 4–1 victory over the local UN peacekeeping force in 1994, a 1–1 draw against Parma F.C. while on tour in Italy, and a 3–1 victory over the Iranian national team in Teheran.

In 1994–95, the first-ever Bosnia and Herzegovina championship was held. Sarajevo came first in their six-team league in Jablanica, and came runners-up in the final league stage in Zenica, behind local club Čelik. Sarajevo again finished as runners-up to Čelik in 1996–97 (by two points), but beat the Zenica-based club in the Cup final and Super Cup. The Cup was retained the following year, and despite finishing third in the league, Sarajevo was runner-up due to play-offs. There was no play-off in 1998–99; the title was given to Sarajevo but it does not count.

In 2004, Safet Sušić, who played at FK Sarajevo from 1973 to 1982, was voted Bosnia and Herzegovina's best player of the last 50 years at the UEFA Jubilee Awards.
Sarajevo were runners-up in the Bosnia and Herzegovina Premier League in 2006–07, but won their second title the following season, beating Zrinjski Mostar by three points. Sarajevo have been a regular in Europa League qualification in the 21st century, but are yet to make the group stages. Off the back of their 2006–07 league title under manager Husref Musemić, Sarajevo played in the UEFA Champions League for the first time in its current format. They beat Maltese champions Marsaxlokk F.C. 6:0 away in their first game, eventually winning 9:1 on aggregate. The second round saw Sarajevo defeat Belgians KRC Genk on away goals due to a 2:1 away win in the first leg, although the club was knocked out in the play-offs for the competition's Group stage by Ukrainian champions Dynamo Kyiv who won 4:0 on aggregate. The club made the play-offs round of the 2009–10 UEFA Europa League and faced CFR Cluj but lost 3–2 on aggregate. The team defeated Spartak Trnava and Helsingborg to get to the play-offs round.

Vincent Tan era - a financial injection

Vincent Tan, a Malaysian businessman and the owner of the Championship club Cardiff City, bought FK Sarajevo in late 2013 pledging to invest $2 million into the club. Under the deal, Cardiff will cooperate with FK Sarajevo, exchanging players and taking part in a football academy, yet to be established, which Tan has said would lure new talents. Under Tan's management the club brought in quality players with the likes of Miloš Stojčev, Džemal Berberović and Nemanja Bilbija who helped the club win the 2013–14 Bosnian Cup, their first silverware since winning the Premier League in 2006–07. Prior to the Cup triumph, Robert Jarni was brought in as the new manager of the club in December 2013 by Tan, but was quickly dismissed only 4 months into his tenure (on 7 April 2014, while the team was still in the semi-finals of the Bosnian Cup) due to the team failing to keep its chances of winning the domestic league title alive during later stages of the 2013–14 season. FK Sarajevo played a friendly match against Tan's Cardiff City FC U21 winning 4–1. In 2014–15 UEFA Europa League, FK Sarajevo eliminated FK Haugesund and Atromitos to qualify for the play-off round, where it lost to German side Borussia Mönchengladbach. On 17 July 2014, Tan presented pledges of assistance of €255,000 each to two hospitals in Doboj and Maglaj during the halftime break of the UEFA Europa League qualifying match between Sarajevo and Norwegian club Haugesund at the Olympic Stadium in Sarajevo. The money raised would be used to purchase and donate much-needed medical equipment for the two hospitals. In June 2014, Tan made a personal donation of €114,000, while the people of Malaysia raised a total of €169,000 toward Bosnia's flood relief fund. In May 2014, the heaviest rains and floods in 120 years hit Bosnia and the surrounding region. The worst affected areas were the towns of Doboj and Maglaj, which were cut off from the rest of the country when floods deluged all major roads. Damage from landslides and floods was estimated to run into hundreds of millions of euros and twenty-four people lost their lives. The cost of the disaster, an official said, could exceed that of the Bosnian War. On 5 August 2014, Sarajevo signed a cooperation agreement with third-tier Bosnian club NK Bosna Visoko, by which Sarajevo will loan its talented youngsters to the Visoko-based side and will have first-buy rights on all of Bosna players. The agreement was signed by Adis Hajlovac and Mirza Laletović on behalf of Bosna, and Abdulah Ibraković on behalf of Sarajevo. The agreement de facto names Bosna the club's farm team. On 26 September 2014, manager Dženan Uščuplić was relieved of his duties as first team manager and was transferred back to the youth academy. On 30 September 2014, former Barcelona, Real Sociedad and Bosnia and Herzegovina national team striker Meho Kodro was appointed manager. On 24 February 2015, Sarajevo signed a three and a half-year general sponsorship agreement with Turkish Airlines which has been labeled the most lucrative in Bosnian professional sports history. On 21 April, after poor league results, the club sacked Kodro and once again named Dženan Uščuplić manager until the end of the season. On 30 May the team defeated Sloboda Tuzla in the season's last fixture, thus winning the league title after an eight-year drought. The next season was a turbulent one for the club. After Uščuplić left his post, former Partizan and CSKA Sofia manager Miodrag Ješić took over the helm, only to be sacked after a string of disappointing results, with Almir Hurtić leading the side to a disappointing 4th-place finish in the league. On 29 August 2016, after another string of bad results at the start of the 2016–17 season, Hurtić was sacked and Mehmed Janjoš was named manager.

Club's domestic revival
Since March 2019, FK Sarajevo is run by Vietnamese businessman Nguyễn Hoài Nam and the PVF Investment and Trading, JSC (Promotion Fund of Vietnamese Football Talents F.C.).

The club has won back to back titles in Bosnia under managers Husref Musemić and Vinko Marinović; both 2018–19 and 2019–20 seasons of the Bosnian Premier League and a 2018–19 Bosnian Cup triumph as well.

Crest and colours

The club's traditional colours are maroon and white, while in recent years black, gray and gold have also been represented as alternative club colours. As the story goes, the club's founders wanted to create a visual distinction between the new side and all other Yugoslav clubs of the time. They chose maroon as the club's feature colour and in doing so preserved the identity of defunct club Šparta that operated in the city of Sarajevo during the early years of the Kingdom of SHS. The club colors were used as a reference during the formation of USD Bosna, a sporting society that included former Euroleague winner KK Bosna Royal, by the society's founders – all supporters of the club. FK Sarajevo's nickname is based on club colours, which have become a major pop culture reference in the city. The first official club crest depicted a red, five pointed communist star with golden borders containing a golden silhouette of a footballer. Further more, a blue gear-like circular frame, representing socialist industrialization, contained the club name. In the early 1950s the club crest was changed for the first time. It namely received a badge-like form and was split vertically into two sides of which the outer held the club name and aforementioned communist star, while the inner contained a football with the club's foundation year under it. In the early 1970s the club crest was restylized, keeping the previous motifs that can still be found on today's club crest. The color yellow was added to the restylized crest's borders at this time, giving it a fresher look. On the 30th anniversary of the club's founding in 1976, the club crest was again slightly altered. With the end of the Bosnian War in 1996 the club crest was once again slightly altered by the replacement of the ideologically-motivated communist star with a Bosnian Fleur-de-lis and a slight stylization of the crest's design, including the lettering font, which in subsequent years became one of the club's biggest trademarks. The adding of Fleur-de-lis motifs to their crests was a common practice by Bosnian football clubs in the first few years after the war. The Fleur-de-lis was eventually removed altogether from the club crest in 2009, which today lacks any ideological or national symbolism. Instead, the club readily emphasizes the two pre-war crests as part of its heritage, often selling souvenirs that are embroidered with them. The Bosnian Fleur-de-lis was once again restored as a temporary club motif during the 2013–14 season, when it was included in the third kit design.

Stadium and training grounds

FK Sarajevo play at the Asim Ferhatović Hase Stadium, formerly known as the Koševo Stadium. It is owned by the City of Sarajevo but is leased to the club on a long term basis. The club runs and operates the stadium and has sole commercial and developmental rights to the olympic complex until at least 2051, with the possibility of a further 15 year extension. The current seating capacity is 34,500. The stadium was opened in 1947 and named after the Sarajevo neighbourhood of Koševo, where it is located. The stadium was literally buried into a local hill thus merging with its natural surroundings. In 1950 a pitch and a tartan track were also added. The first international football match at the stadium was played between Yugoslavia and Turkey, in 1954.

In 1966, the stadium hosted the Balkan Games and was again renovated for the occasion. A new administration building was built, as were new locker rooms and a restaurant. A modern scoreboard and new lighting were also provided. In 1984, the stadium was reconstructed for the 1984 Winter Olympics that were held in Sarajevo, and is therefore often unofficially called The Olympic Stadium. It is important to note that on 7 February 1984, the Asim H. Ferhatović stadium hosted the opening ceremony of the games, and seated roughly 50,000. The West stand held 18,500 seating places at the time.

In 2004 the stadium's official name was changed to Asim H. Ferhatović, in memory of legendary FK Sarajevo striker Asim Ferhatović, who died after a heart attack in 1987. In 1998, three years after the end of the Bosnian War, the stadium was renovated for a fourth time. The seating capacity of the stadium was reduced to 34,500 and new seats were added. The ground has held matches for Sarajevo and their local rival FK Željezničar, including Europa League and Champions League fixtures. Furthermore, the stadium has hosted the national teams of Yugoslavia and Bosnia and Herzegovina on numerous occasions, as well as many notable athletic meetings.

The stadium's highest attendance was recorded in a 1981–82 league match between FK Sarajevo and their city rival FK Željezničar. Allegedly, roughly 60.000 people attended the game. The stadium's largest post-war attendance was recorded in the 2002–2003 UEFA Champions League third qualifying round match between FK Željezničar and Newcastle United F.C. Allegedly, about 34,000 people attended the game.

The club's current training ground, known as the Butmir Training Centre is located in the Ilidža municipality of the Sarajevo Canton. The complex was opened in October 2015 and comprises a 70,000 square meter (17 acre) surface, containing state of the art facilities. It is also used by the club's youth school and women's team. The main artificial turf pitch is named after club legend Želimir Vidović, who was killed during the Siege of Sarajevo while transporting wounded citizens to a nearby hospital. A statue of Vidović was erected on the western grass knoll that encompasses the turf.

Organization

Ownership and finances
FK Sarajevo is a registered Private company limited by guarantee and corporate personhood that, unlike football clubs that are registered as limited companies, does not issue shares by which individuals or corporations can buy majority or minority ownership. Instead, the club's members act as guarantors by buying non-ownership based management stakes in the form of contributions, earning in return managing and voting rights. The guarantors give an undertaking to contribute a nominal amount in the event of the winding up of the company. It is often believed that such a company cannot distribute its profits to its members but, depending on the provisions of the articles, as is the case with FK Sarajevo, it very well may. Managing rights imply the right to form and control the club assembly, steering committee and Supervisory Board, by which the largest contributor de jure takes full control of the club. Furthermore, the fact that the largest contributor may negotiate profit provisions between himself and the club opens the possibility for large-scale financial investment that exceeds charitable and non-profit contributions that are usually the cornerstone of companies limited by guarantee.

Malaysian billionaire, investor and former Chairman of Berjaya Group, Vincent Tan, was the club's majority contributor and thus its sole operator. After gaining control of the club in December 2013 by contributing 2 million $, Tan negotiated an agreement between himself and the club, by which he will invest an undisclosed sum while also running the operational finances and policies of the club, in return gaining the right to profit as would be the case of the club being a limited company. Furthermore, the formation of Public limited companies in the fields of real estate and tourism have been negotiated between the club and Tan, by which the companies will represent a joint venture by both parties, earning the club complete financial self-sustainability in the future. After taking control of the club, Vincent Tan dissolved the long-standing steering committee and Supervisory Board, opting to create a five-member board of directors for the day-to-day running of the club. He appointed two of his Malaysian business associates, Ken Choo i Lim Meng Kwong, members of the board alongside three local members. The club's annual operational expenditure and budget have been undisclosed since Tan gained control of the club. In September 2015 the club paid off the last of its public and private debt, thus becoming one of the rare debt-free clubs in eastern Europe.

In March 2019, it was announced that the ownership majority package was sold to Vietnamese businessman Nguyễn Hoài Nam and the PVF Investment and Trading, JSC (Promotion Fund of Vietnamese Football Talents F.C.).

The club's general sponsor is Turkish Airlines, with whom it signed a lucrative four-year deal in 2015. It has been hailed as the most profitable sponsorship agreement in the history of Bosnian sports. FK Sarajevo's kit has been manufactured by Erreà since 2021. The club has a variety of other sponsors and official partners, which include Tourism Malaysia, Visit Vietnam, BH Telecom, Securitas, Škoda, Bosna Bank International, NLB Group, Hayat TV, Sarajevo Brewing Company and others.

Management

Board of directors
As of 3 April 2022

Club administration
As of 23 November 2022

Social responsibility
Social responsibility and humanitarian work is one of the fundamental values of FK Sarajevo, and the club is well known for its attitude towards it. The club operates an aid and social programs foundation, which seeks to encourage learning and promote healthy living amongst disadvantaged children, young people and families. Furthermore, the club has been on the forefront of community development for years, donating large sums of money through its foundation to underdeveloped municipalities and school districts. The club organizes traditional blood donation conventions in its private clinic every month, while raising awareness for health issues that are impacting society. An annual arts competition is organized by the club in which primary school children in the Sarajevo Canton are asked to draw or paint a mascot for the team. The three best ranked artists get scholarships for afterschool arts and crafts programs. Women's rights are an important aspect of the club's community and social development programs. Apart from sponsoring a battered women's shelter in downtown Sarajevo, the club also bestows free stadium entrance to all female fans on the week of International Women's Day. FK Sarajevo has a signed partnership with one of the leading Bosnian charity and youth development agencies, Pomozi.ba, with whom it cooperates on numerous projects across the country while promoting the agency on its kit. The club is firmly committed to the development of Srebrenica and has been awarding yearly scholarships to hundreds of children from the town, while also sponsoring the local multiethnic football team, FK Guber. FK Sarajevo is one of the eight core members of the 2nd Chance Group CIC-led project "Give Football A Chance", the others being Altınordu, Athletic Bilbao, Atromitos, Hammarby, Schalke 04, Sheffield United and Vitesse. The project's goal is the improvement of health and well-being of more than 5000 children living in conflict zones and implementing a comprehensive program of both formal and informal education for the children. In the aftermath of the 2014 Southeast Europe floods that devastated numerous towns in the country, FK Sarajevo was a major contributor to the massive relief effort. The club organized and sent volunteers to the stricken towns, and helped finance the rebuilding of homes both directly and through its foundation. The club's Malaysian owner Vincent Tan was also a major contributor to the relief effort, personally donating 250,000 KM to hospitals in Maglaj and Doboj. In January 2016 FK Sarajevo hosted Syrian refugee children, in cooperation with UNICEF and the Red Cross. In October 2016 FK Sarajevo, together with FK Novi Pazar and FK Velež, organized a friendly match in Mostar. The profits from the match tickets went to a fund for Syrian refugees. The club employs war veterans from the Ilidža municipality in its training centre as a way of giving back to the community.

Honours

Domestic

League
Premier League of Bosnia and Herzegovina:
 Winners (5): 1998–99, 2006–07, 2014–15, 2018–19, 2019–20
Runners-up (7): 1994–95, 1996–97, 1997–98, 2005–06, 2010–11, 2012–13, 2020–21
Yugoslav First League:
 Winners (2): 1966–67, 1984–85
Runners-up (2): 1964–65, 1979–80
Yugoslav Second League:
 Winners (1): 1948–49

Cups
Bosnia and Herzegovina Cup:
 Winners (7): 1996–97, 1997–98, 2001–02, 2004–05, 2013–14, 2018–19, 2020–21 (record) 
Runners-up (4): 1998–99, 2000–01, 2016–17, 2021–22
Yugoslav Cup:
Runners-up (2): 1966–67, 1982–83
Supercup of Bosnia and Herzegovina:
 Winners (1): 1997
Runners-up (2): 1998, 1999

European
 European Cup/UEFA Champions League:
 (Best) Round of 16 (1): 1967–68
UEFA Cup/UEFA Europa League:
 (Best) Round of 16 (1): 1982–83

Doubles
Premier League and National Cup (1): 2018–19Players

Current squad

Out on loan

Ismir Pintol trophy
The Ismir Pintol trophy, is a trophy awarded to the most distinguished player in the past season and named after deceased FK Sarajevo fan Ismir Pintol. The winner of the trophy is decided by popular vote on the official website of the club's supporters and has been awarded since 2003. To be eligible to participate in the poll, a player must appear for the club in at least 10 official matches. The trophy was not awarded on five separate occasions as an indicator of the supporters' dissatisfaction with team results. As of 2019, the only player to have won the trophy on two separate occasions is Sedin Torlak.WinnersFormer players
For details of former players, see: List of FK Sarajevo players, and :Category:FK Sarajevo players.

Youth department and affiliates

The FK Sarajevo Youth School, the club's youth department, is split into two sections. Namely, The Asim Ferhatović Hase School of Football, named after legendary striker Asim Ferhatović, and the FK Sarajevo Academy. The former functions as both a general model for the popularization of the sport and as a filtering mechanism, used to pick out locally based footballing talents which are later transferred to the Academy. The Academy, in turn, is a top-of-the-line boarding school which brings in the biggest talents from Bosnia and Herzegovina and organizes the competitive youth selections for the club. The department was founded in the 1950s and has been historically known as one of the best youth systems in the former Yugoslavia. FK Sarajevo's youth selections train in two venues: the Asim Ferhatović Hase Sports Complex and the elite Butmir Training Centre, which is currently undergoing a huge expansion as of July 2016.

Personnel
Technical staff
As of 12 December 2022, the staff includes:

Medical staff
As of 30 December 2019, the staff includes:

Historical
Presidents
Below is a list of FK Sarajevo presidents from 1946 until the present day.

Managerial history

Below is a list of FK Sarajevo managers from 1946 until the present day.

Technical/Sporting directors
Below is a list of FK Sarajevo Technical director, later Sporting directors and their respective tenures.

Memorials

Below is a list of memorials established by the club.
 Horde Zla
 The club raised a memorial outside of the north stand of the Asim Ferhatović Hase Stadium which bears tribute to hundreds of members of the club's ultras group, Horde Zla, killed in the defense of the city during the Siege of Sarajevo.
 Svetozar Vujović
 Svetozar Vujović played for the club from 1959 to 1972 and was a key member of the 1967 championship winning generation. After retiring, he managed the club for one season before being named club director – a position he held for over twenty years. With the start of the Siege of Sarajevo in 1992, Vujović remained in the city, declining numerous offers for refuge. Following his death on 16 January 1993, FK Sarajevo named the club's main ceremonial lounge room in its administrative facility, located in downtown Sarajevo, "The Svetozar Vujović Salon" in his honor.
 Asim Ferhatović – Hase
 Asim Ferhatović was a legendary club forward that netted 66 goals in 174 league matches, thus becoming the club's leading all-time goal scorer in official fixtures. He is considered one of the greatest players to ever play for the maroon-whites. The Koševo Stadium that is owned by the city and leased on a long term basis by the club is named after Ferhatović, who died in 1987. The club's School of Football, which is a part of its youth departement, is also named after him.
 Želimir Vidović – Keli
 Želimir Vidović was a star player for the club during the 1970s and early 1980s. On 17 May 1992, with the Siege of Sarajevo already underway, Vidović took part in an operation to help transport wounded civilians to a nearby hospital in the Sarajevo neighbourhood of Dobrinja. After the convoy was stopped by Serb forces he was executed with his remains being buried in a mass grave. An annual tournament in his honour has been organized since 2004, while the main pitch at the recently built FK Sarajevo Training Centre is also named after him. A statue of Vidović was erected on the western grass knoll that encompasses the pitch.
 Ismir Pintol 
 Ismir Pintol was a 6-year-old FK Sarajevo supporter who passed away on 29 June 2002 after a lengthy battle with leukemia. The club, in cooperation with its fan association, established the Ismir Pintol trophy ("Trofej Ismir Pintol"), which is awarded to the most distinguished player of the past season. The trophy has been awarded since the 2002–03 season. Traditionally, vocal support for the team in the first six minutes of every season's last home fixture is not shown, with fans remaining in their seats in memory of the boy. The trophy is awarded before kick off at the base of the north stand. 
 Vedran Puljić 
 Vedran Puljić was a 24-year-old member of the club's ultras group, Horde zla who was killed by single gun shot wound during the infamous Široki Brijeg football riots on 4 October 2009. The single gun shot wound that killed Puljić was allegedly fired by a member of the local police force, Oliver Knezović, who was arrested shortly after but never prosecuted. On 23 May 2013 the curva at the north stand of the Koševo stadium, traditionally the main base for the Horde Zla was named in honor of Puljić. Furthermore, the club commemorates his death by holding a vigil at his grave site once a year on the anniversary of his death.

Notes
1 Includes Caretaker managers
2 Official title has been changed to Head of the Scouting DepartmentClub records and statistics

FK Sarajevo, under the name Torpedo, played its first match on 3 November 1946 against Bratstvo Travnik, winning 6–0. The club's first Yugoslav First League tie was a 2–2 draw against Ponziana Trieste on 25 August 1947. The maroon-whites played their first official European match on 18 July 1960 in the Mitropa Cup, losing 2–4 to MTK Budapest. FK Sarajevo's record-holder for number of club appearances is Ibrahim Biogradlić. He played 646 games for the maroon-whites between 1951 and 1967. The goal-scoring record-holder is striker Dobrivoje Živkov who scored 212 goals in both official and unofficial matches for the club. The goal-scoring record-holder in official matches is legendary striker Asim Ferhatović, who found the back of the net on 100 occasions in all official competitions, including 98 league goals (198 in total). Over 50 FK Sarajevo players were capped for the Yugoslav and Bosnian national teams. Former FK Sarajevo defender Faruk Hadžibegić is the third most capped player in the history of the Yugoslav national team with 65 caps. He captained The Blues at the 1990 FIFA World Cup. Former FK Sarajevo defender Mirsad Fazlagić captained Yugoslavia at UEFA Euro 1968 and was named part of the all-tournament team. Former FK Sarajevo midfielder Elvir Baljić would break Real Madrid's transfer record in a 1999 move from Fenerbahçe. The Galacticos paid a transfer fee of €26 million for the Bosnian. Former FK Sarajevo player Safet Sušić would be named Bosnia and Herzegovina's UEFA Golden Jubilee inductee in 2004. Six of the ten former Bosnia and Herzegovina national team managers are former FK Sarajevo players: Fuad Muzurović, Džemaludin Mušović, Faruk Hadžibegić, Denijel Pirić, Miroslav Blažević and Safet Sušić. FK Sarajevo was the most successful club from Bosnia and Herzegovina in the Yugoslav First League, winning two titles and finishing runners-up on two other occasions. The club is ranked 6th in that competition's All-time league table. FK Sarajevo is the record-holder for number of Bosnian Cup triumphs (7). The maroon-whites are first in the All-time table of the Premier League of Bosnia and Herzegovina, seven points more than Željezničar. They have won the national championship five times, finishing runners-up on six occasions. FK Sarajevo is Bosnia and Herzegovina's best rated representative in European competitions.

Recent finishes and attendance*Note: The 2016–17 season was the first to be organized with 12 teams and a two-stage format – Regular season league and Championship/Relegation league rounds. The top six teams in the regular season qualified for the Championship league round, while the bottom six competed between themselves in an effort to avoid relegation. That format lasted until the end of the 2017–18 season, after which the league returned to the old format, this time having 33 full rounds.

European record

Last updated on 15 July 2021.Pld = Matches played; W = Matches won; D = Matches drawn; L = Matches lost; GF = Goals for; GA = Goals against. 

Women's football

FK Sarajevo also operates a women's football team, SFK 2000 Sarajevo. They have been affiliated to the men's team since 2015, when a fusion was signed on 4 July of the same year after which the club assumed the FK Sarajevo crest and colours. The club was founded in June 2000 as part of the Alija Miladin recreational association, after which it tied itself to a now-defunct men's football team from the Otoka neighbourhood of Sarajevo. They play their home games at the Otoka stadium, the home ground of Bosnian Premier League club FK Olimpic Sarajevo. Since the club's founding it has become the strongest element
in Bosnian women's football, winning 14 consecutive national titles, 13 consecutive national cups (13 doubles) and representing the country in European competitions, as well as being the most decorated women's club in the Former Yugoslavia. The club has participated in the UEFA Women's Cup from 2003 onwards but never reached the final rounds. In the 2009–10 UEFA Women's Champions League, when the competition was rebranded and reorganized, the side reached the round of 32, a feat repeated during the 2012–13 season. The side's best UEFA women's club ranking was 17th in August 2013. SFK 2000 players form the core of the Bosnia and Herzegovina women's national team, while the side's manager, Samira Hurem, is the longstanding Bosnia & Herzegovina manager. The women's section of the club also operates a detached youth system for girls from the ages of five to sixteen. On 29 August 2016 the club qualified for the Round of 32 in the Women's Champions League for a third time in its History. On 1 September 2016 the team drew WFC Rossiyanka of Russia in the round of 32. The club once again qualified for the round of 32, this time in the 2018–19 UEFA Women's Champions League season, but got eliminated by Chelsea F.C. 11–0 on aggregate.

USD Bosna

FK Sarajevo garners a close relationship with USD Bosna', or University Sport Society Bosna. The society was founded on 7 December 1947 with the goal of organizing the existing university student sports clubs in Sarajevo. USD Bosna was the largest sport society in the Socialist Republic of Bosnia and Herzegovina, with teams in 19 sports. The most notable members of said society are KK Bosna Royal, that won the Euroleague Basketball title in 1979 and RK Bosna Sarajevo, that reached the 1/8 finals of the EHF Champions League in 2011.
The relationship traditionally stems from the fact that both sides share unique maroon and white club colours, which lead KK Bosna Royal to garner most of its fan base from FK Sarajevo in its rise to the top in the mid and late 1970s. Through time the two sides became colloquially interchangeable, as the FK Sarajevo organized supporters group, Horde Zla, equally followed both, forming a so-called Maroon Family. Even though RK Bosna did not represent a big player in Yugoslav handball, the club's post-war ascent was thoroughly supported by Horde zla.

On 29 August 2013 FK Sarajevo and RK Bosna Sarajevo signed a cooperation agreement based on the principle of strengthening ties between the aforementioned family members. On 6 November 2013 the same was done between FK Sarajevo and KK Bosna Royal, by which the forty-year-old relationship was officialized.

Supporters

FK Sarajevo is one of the two most popular clubs in Bosnia and Herzegovina, having a large fanbase across the country, the Sandžak region of Serbia and Montenegro and the Bosnian diaspora, especially in Germany, Austria, Switzerland, Scandinavia, Canada, Australia and the United States. The largest diaspora fan association is registered in Stuttgart under the name Horde Zla Stuttgart. The club's supporters in the US formed FC Bordo Saint Louis in 2013 as an hommage to the club, with the side competing in the National Premier Soccer League as of 2014.

From the moment FK Sarajevo was established on 24 October 1946 it quickly grew a following in the city of Sarajevo. The fact that nearly all pre-war Sarajevan clubs were banned by the new communist authorities left a large vacuum in a city that was traditionally a footballing centre in the Kingdom of Yugoslavia. The majority of fans stemmed from the numerous downtown Sarajevan Baščaršija, Stari grad and Centar neighbourhoods predominantly inhabited by Bosniaks. This is not to say that other ethnicities did not support the club. They did in huge numbers, but the history of organized support for the club is nevertheless closely tied to the aforementioned neighbourhoods which culturally and historically represent the soul of the city.

FK Sarajevo fans have been historically called Pitari while an individual was, and is still known as a Pitar. The nickname, meaning a consumer of the local Bosnian dish pita, was originally a derogatory label given by fans of working class Željezničar that implied the pre-war upper-class background of most FK Sarajevo supporters. This notion was based on the fact that the old downtown neighbourhoods of the city, were the traditional centres of commerce and artisanship, even though the socioeconomic landscape of the city had dramatically changed by the time the club was formed.

The organized supporters' group of FK Sarajevo is known as Horde Zla (English: Hordes of Evil or Evil Gang) and was formed in 1987 with the arrival of the Ultras subculture to Yugoslavia. The group is situated on the north stand of the Asim Ferhatović Hase Stadium, and has a fairly decentralized organizational structure with many subgroups present at matches. The group's logo consists of a stylized depiction of the Grim Reaper, borrowed from a Zagor comic book at the time of the group's inception. Horde Zla have gained notoriety through the decades because of infamous examples of football violence. The group traditionally garners very close relations with the supporters of Dynamo Dresden, with the two groups often travelling together to away games of both clubs and sharing banners. Horde Zla have in the past garnered close relations with the FK Novi Pazar ultras group, Torcida Sandžak.

Another notable supporters' association and advocacy group is Maroon Friends 1946 which attracts influential individuals from the financial, political and cultural sectors of Bosnian society with the aim of lobbying both locally and internationally for the club and influencing club policies. The association has close ties to Horde Zla. The current chairman of Maroon Friends 1946 is prominent singer-songwriter and poet, Benjamin Isović.

Rivalries
Sarajevo derby

FK Sarajevo's biggest rivalry is with fellow Sarajevo club FK Željezničar. Meetings between these rivals are known as the Sarajevo derby or the Eternal derby''. The Sarajevo derby is particularly noted for the passion of both supporters groups. The stands of both teams feature fireworks, coloured confetti, flags, rolls of paper, torches, smoke, drums, giant posters and choreographies, used to create visual grandeur and apply psychological pressure on the visiting teams, hence the slogan, "Hellcome to Sarajevo". The roots of the rivalry can be traced back to the strong historical animosity between the capital's working class and bourgeoisie, wherein the former traditionally inhabited the more liberal, yet poorer suburban neighbourhoods and mainly supported FK Željezničar, while the latter resided in the traditional and wealthy, old and central parts of the city and represented the main fan-base of FK Sarajevo. Furthermore, since its formation, FK Sarajevo has always been closely tied to the political and financial elites of Bosnia and Herzegovina, both in socialist Yugoslavia and since the country's independence, while FK Željezničar seldom had such influential support and has been considered a club of common folk, even though this notion can be disputed. Even though the rivalry between the two sides grew large from the very formation of FK Sarajevo, the two teams only met in friendly fixtures for the better part of a decade due to the fact that they competed in different levels of the Yugoslav football league system. The first official league match was held in 1954; FK Sarajevo won 6–1. This is still the biggest victory by any team in the Sarajevo derby. It is important to note that in the past few decades the class divide between clubs has partly eroded and both fan bases gather support from all classes, but the historical differences and animosities are still visible.

As of 8 March 2023, 148 Sarajevo derbies have been played, with 44 wins for FK Sarajevo, 46 for FK Željezničar and 58 draws (177:181).

Other rivalries

FK Sarajevo also shares a strong historic rivalry with NK Čelik Zenica as well as a relatively new rivalry with NK Široki Brijeg which came into being as a result of the 2009 Široki Brijeg riots that cost the life of FK Sarajevo supporter Vedran Puljić and resulted in over thirty serious injuries including four gunshot wounds. There are conflicting reports about who started the violence. Horde Zla accused local residents and police for their mistreatment on their way to the match, and right up to entering the stadium. The official statement of Horde Zla claims that the incident was planned by local politicians and that their buses were separated and parked too far from the stadium which left them open to stoning and attacks. They also claim that initially there were only 30 local policemen present, and they did nothing to prevent the violence. Local police and residents said Horde Zla fans were the first to attack. According to local police officials, most of the regional police had earlier been sent to the nearby city of Mostar to prevent possible violence during the match between city rivals Zrinjski and Velež. The subsequent violence that followed resulted in Verdan Puljić's death. Since the riots, meetings of the two sides carry an ominous atmosphere. Sarajevo shares another relatively new rivalry with HŠK Zrinjski Mostar based on both clubs' playing pivotal roles in Bosnian football.

Relations

Affiliated clubs
 Cardiff City

Friends
 Dynamo Dresden

Kit and sponsorships

References

Further reading

External links

  
 FK Sarajevo at UEFA
 FK Sarajevo at N/FSBiH 
 FKSinfo Archive, history and statistics  

 
Sport in Sarajevo
Football clubs from Sarajevo
Football clubs in Bosnia and Herzegovina
Football clubs in Yugoslavia
Association football clubs established in 1946
1946 establishments in Bosnia and Herzegovina